The Qitaihe bombing was a mass murder that occurred during a film screening attended by 900 people at the Fuqiang Brigade Club, in Dongfeng, a commune in Qitaihe, Heilongjiang, China on December 1, 1979, when two brothers, Xu Fenghao and Xu Fengde, detonated a bomb that killed 86 people and wounded 222 others, 35 of them seriously. During four nights the two had buried five bombs consisting of a total of 180 kg of stolen explosives, 15 kg of gasoline and diesel, and 30 detonators at the club. The case was solved 55 days later. Both were sentenced to death.

References

Mass murder in 1979
Improvised explosive device bombings in China
History of Heilongjiang
Building bombings in China
1979 murders in China
Terrorist incidents in China in 1979
Attacks on cinemas